SV Mettlach is a German association football club from the city of Mettlach, Saarland.



History
The side has its origins in the establishment of the gymnastics club Turnverein Mettlach in 1885. A football department was formed in 1920 and became independent in 1923. Following World War II all organizations across the country, including sports and football associations, were ordered disbanded by occupying Allied authorities. The team was re-established 12 May 1946 as Spielvereinigung Mettlach out of the former memberships of several local clubs and resumed its traditional identity as Sportverein 1920 Mettlach in 1950.

Following the war, the Saarland was occupied by France and administered as the Saar protectorate. Although still considered part of Germany, the state was subject attempts to make it part of France or to create a separate country there until it was re-united with Germany following a 1955 plebiscite. This was manifested in football through the establishment of a league structure separate from the German Football Association (Deutscher Fußball Bund), the appearance of the region's top sides in French competition, and the formation of a national side that took part in qualification play for the 1954 FIFA World Cup.

After the 1950–51 season, Saarland's domestic football competition was re-integrated with Germany's. SV remained in lower level local play until advancing to the 2. Amateurliga Saar/West (III) in 1957. Mettlach fielded competitive sides through the late 1950s and early 1960s, earning a string of top-three finishes in third- and fourth-tier play. Following the formation of the top-flight Bundesliga in 1963, the club's performance deteriorated.

By the early 1980s, SV was part of the Verbandsliga Saarland (IV) and would continue to compete as a fourth-tier side there and in the Oberliga Südwest (IV) until the turn of the millennium. Mettlach made appearances in the opening rounds of the DFB-Pokal (German Cup) in 1985 and 1994. The team slipped to what had become the fifth-tier Verbandsliga Saar in 2002, and recently won its way back to Oberliga play for 2008–09 but lasted for only one season before being relegated down to the new Saarlandliga.

Honours
The club's honours:

 2. Amateurliga Saar-West (IV)
 Champions: 1961, 1966
 Bezirksliga Saarland-West (V)
 Champions: 1981
 Landesliga Saarland-SW (V)
 Champions: 1983
 Verbandsliga Saarland (V)
 Champions: 1993, 2000, 2008
 Saarland Cup
 Winners: 1984, 1993, 1995

Recent seasons
The recent season-by-season performance of the club:

 With the introduction of the Regionalligas in 1994 and the 3. Liga in 2008 as the new third tier, below the 2. Bundesliga, all leagues below dropped one tier. The Saarlandliga was introduced in 2009 and replaced the Verbandsliga Saarland at the sixth tier of football in the Saarland. In 2012 the Oberliga Südwest was renamed Oberliga Rheinland-Pfalz/Saar.

References

External links
Official team site
Das deutsche Fußball-Archiv historical German domestic league tables 

Football clubs in Germany
Football clubs in Saarland
Association football clubs established in 1920
1920 establishments in Germany